Ná-Meo (Vietnamese: Na Miểu;) is a language of northern Vietnam, spoken by the Mieu people. Nguyen (2007) believes Na Meo may be a Hmongic language closest to Qiandong Miao.

Classification
This is evidenced by the sound change Proto-Hmong–Mien *-ɛŋ > Proto-Na Meo-Guncen-Zhenmin *-a.

Distribution
The following locations are reported in Ethnologue.

Khánh Long Commune, Tràng Định District, northwestern Lạng Sơn Province
Khuổi Phu Dao village
Cao Minh Commune
Ca Liec village, Thạch An District, Cao Bằng Province

Nguyen (2007:31) reports the following additional locations.

Khuổi Giảo village, Cao Minh Commune, Tràng Định District, Lạng Sơn Province
Cai Liệng village, Thúy Hùng Commune, Thạch An District, Cao Bằng Province (ancestors crossed over from China via Trùng Khánh District)
Vũ Loan Commune, Na Rì District, Bắc Kạn Province
Kim Quan Commune, Yên Sơn District, Tuyên Quang Province (ancestors came from Yunnan to Bắc Giang Province via the Red River). Hsiu (2015) identifies the hamlet of Khuân Hẻ as the sole Na Meo-speaking location in Kim Quan Commune, Tuyên Quang Province.

References

Sources
Hsiu, Andrew (2015). The classification of Na Meo, a Hmong-Mien language of Vietnam. Paper presented at SEALS 25, Chiang Mai, Thailand. 
Nguyễn Văn Thắng (2007). Ambiguity of Identity: The Mieu in North Vietnam. Chiang Mai: Silkworm Books.
Nguyễn Anh Ngọc (1975). "Vài nét về nhóm Na Miểu". In, Ủy ban khoa học xã hội Việt Nam: Viện dân tộc học. Về vấn đề xác định thánh phần các dân tộc thiểu số ở miền bắc Việt Nam, 377-388. Hà Nội: Nhà xuất bản khoa học xã hội.

Hmongic languages
Languages of Vietnam